Ronald Hugh Aldridge (born October 31, 1950) is an American lawyer and politician who served one term in the Mississippi House of Representatives. In 1987, he lost his bid for reelection to Democrat J. Kane Ditto. He served as Mississippi state director of the National Federation of Independent Business from 1989 to 1992 and from 1998 to 2020.

References

1950 births
Living people
Republican Party members of the Mississippi House of Representatives
University of Mississippi alumni
University of Mississippi School of Law alumni
20th-century American lawyers
20th-century American politicians